The Commodore 65 (also known as the C64DX) is a prototype computer created at Commodore Business Machines in 1990–1991. It is an improved version of the Commodore 64, and it was meant to be backwards-compatible with the older computer, while still providing a number of advanced features close to those of the Amiga.

History 
In September 1989 Compute!'s Gazette noted that "Sales of the 64 have diminished rapidly, Nintendo has eaten big holes in the market, and the life of the old warhorse computer should somehow be extended." Noting that Apple had developed the IIGS to extend the life of its Apple II series, the magazine asked "Will Commodore take the same tack?", then continued:

The Gazette added, "Our sources also report that there is a great deal of infighting at Commodore as to whether the machine should be released. The sales staff wants to get the machine out the door, while the naysaying engineers have dubbed it 'son of Plus/4.'" While the next issue reported that "the latest rumor is that such a machine will never see the light of day", Fred Bowen and others at Commodore in 1990–1991 developed the Commodore 65 (C65) as a successor to the C64. In the end of 1990 the decision to create the C65 was taken. The project was cancelled by Commodore's chairman Irving Gould in 1991.

When Commodore International was liquidated in 1994, a number of prototypes were sold on the open market, and thus a few people actually own a Commodore 65. Estimates as to the actual number of machines found on the open market range from 50 to 2000 units. As the C65 project was cancelled, the final 8-bit offering from CBM remained the triple-mode, 1–2 MHz, 128 KB (expandable), C64-compatible Commodore 128 of 1985.

Technical specifications 

 The CPU named CSG 4510 R3 is a custom CSG 65CE02 (a MOS 6502 derivative), combined with two MOS 6526 complex interface adapters (CIAs), a UART serial interface, and a memory mapper to allow for an addressable space of 1MB
 3.54 MHz clock frequency (the C64 runs at 1 MHz)
 A new VIC-III graphics chip named CSG 4567 R5, capable of producing 256 colors from a palette of 4096 colors; available modes include 320×200×256 (8), 640×200×16 (4), 640×400×16 (4), 1280×200×4 (2), and 1280×400×4(2)  ( X×Y×color depth, i.e. number of colors (bit planes) )
 Supports all video modes of VIC-II
 Textmode with 40/80 × 25 characters
 Synchronizable with external video source (genlock)
 Integrated DMA controller (bit blit)
 Two CSG 8580R5 SID sound chips producing stereo sound (the C64 has one SID)
 Separate control (left / right) for volume, filter and modulation
 128 KB RAM, expandable with up to 1 MB using a RAM expansion port similar to that of the Commodore Amiga 500
 128 KB ROM
 Heavily improved BASIC: Commodore BASIC 10.0 (the C64 has the relatively feature-weak BASIC 2.0, which was almost 10 years old by this time.)
 One internal 3½" DSDD floppy disk drive
 Keyboard with 77 keys and an inverted T directional cursor block

Different views

Ports 

Left side:

 Power +5V DC at 2.2A and +12V DC at 0.85A
 2× Control ports DE9M

Back:

 Expansion port 50-pin
 CBM-488 bus using a 6-pin DIN for 1541/1571/1581
 User port: parallel 24-pin (without 9V AC)
 Stereo 2× RCA connector for left and right channel
 RGBA video DE9F
 RF video
 Composite video 8-pin DIN
 External fast floppy drive port - mini-DIN-8

Bottom flap:

 RAM expansion

Dimensions: ≈46 cm wide, 20 cm deep, 5.1 cm high

Chipset names 

The custom chips of the C65 were not meant to have names like the custom chips in the Amiga. Although there are names printed near the chip sockets on various revisions of the circuit board, they were not intended as names for the chips. According to former Commodore engineer Bill Gardei, "The Legend on the PCB was to let others in the organization know [whom] to go to for advice on the chips. We did have an issue with that. But that wasn't the name of the chip at the time. The 4567 was always called the VIC-3. I can see why others outside of Commodore made the connection. But again—no—we never called these chips 'Victor' or 'Bill'."

The custom chips for the C65 are:

 CSG 4510: processor (commonly called "Victor" after Victor Andrade)
 CSG 4567: VIC-III graphics processor (commonly called "Bill" after Bill Gardei)
 CSG 4151: DMAgic DMA controller (designed by Paul Lassa)
 F011C: FDC (floppy disk controller, also designed by Bill Gardei)

The C65 also contains one or two programmable logic arrays depending on the version:

 ELMER: PAL16L8 (C65 versions 1.1, 2A, 2B), PAL20L8 (C65 versions 3-5)
 IGOR: PAL16L8 (C65 version 2B only)

Graphics subsystem 
The main memory of the C65 is shared between the graphics subsystem and the CPU. The memory clock runs at almost twice the speed of the C64. To further increase the bandwidth of the graphics subsystem, the memory is divided into 2× 8-bit wide banks of 64 Kbyte which can be accessed by the CSG-4567 simultaneously. This provides an effective video-DMA bandwidth of 7.2 Mbytes/second which is the same specification as the original 16-bit Commodore Amiga chipset (OCS/ECS). The CPU can use up to half the available bandwidth, since it can only access a single 8-bit bank at a time. In higher demanding video modes, the CPU is slowed down due to increased cycle stealing from the video controller.

Enhanced VIC-II modes 
In addition to having all of the C64 video modes, the CSG-4567 also supports several new character attributes such as "blink" or "bold" and can display any of the new or old video modes in 80 column or 640 horizontal pixel format, as well as the older 40 column 320 pixel format [6]. These enhanced "VIC-II" modes take up to 16 KB of system RAM. The sprite capabilities in all VIC modes are equivalent to the C64.

Bitplane modes 
A new "bitplane" video mode was added to allow the displaying of true bitplane type video, with-up to eight bitplanes in 320 pixel mode and up to four in 640 pixel mode. The CSG-4567 can also time-multiplex the bitplanes to give a true four-color 1280 pixel picture. Vertical resolution is maintained at 200 lines as standard, but can be doubled to 400 with interlace [6]. The VIC-III bitplane modes take up to 64 KB of system RAM in non-interlaced or 128 KB RAM in interlaced (400 line) modes. Since the C65 is equipped with only 128 KB in its basic configuration, these modes would consume the entire RAM, and are therefore only useful in a RAM expanded system. On a basic system, it would probably have made more sense to write software which uses less demanding resolutions with fewer bitplanes - partly because this would consume less of the confined RAM space, but also because more bitplanes would demand a higher video DMA bandwidth and consequently slow down the CPU as a result.

DAT and Blitter 
The bitplanes on the C65 are organized in a less straightforward manner than e.g. on the Commodore Amiga, which organizes the bitplanes as straight rows of pixels:  On the C65, the bytes within the bitplanes are organized as 25 rows of 40 or 80 stacks of 8 sequential bytes, similar to the original 320×200 VIC modes. Because this makes it harder to derive individual byte and pixel addresses from their position in the XY coordinate frame, the C65 provides a conversion mechanism in hardware called Display Address Translator (DAT).

Further aid to the programmer comes in the form of a bit-blitter, which supports

 Copy (up,down,invert), Fill, Swap, Mix (boolean Minterms) Hold, Modulus (window), Interrupt, and Resume modes
 Block operations from 1 byte to 64 KB

DOS 

In contrast to previous 8-bit computers from Commodore, the C65 has a complete DOS through which the built-in 3.5-inch floppy disk drive can be controlled. Disks used by the C65 have a storage capacity of 880 KB and the drive is compatible with C1581. Since this format was uncommon for the former C64 owners, the C65 retains the serial IEC port for external Commodore disk drives. It's possible to use a 1541, 1571, 1581, or other similar model.

The DOS itself is based on the Commodore PET IEEE 8250 drive DOS. Since it can only deal with two floppy disk drives, including the internal, only one external drive may be connected to the internal floppy disk controller. Like earlier systems, up to 4 drives can be daisy-chained on the IEC port.

Interfaces 

The C65 includes the same ports of the C64. In addition, there is a DMA port for memory expansion. The latter is attached just like on the Amiga 500 via a flap in the bottom of the board. The built-in floppy disk drive is connected in parallel, serial Commodore drives can be connected via the usual IEC port. A plug for a genlock was also provided. Only the port for the C64 datasette is no longer available, and the user port missing—like the Aldi C64—the 9 volt AC line. The expansion port differs significantly from all prior C64 variants and rather resembles that of C16.

Sales 

In December 2009, a working C65 on the online auction site eBay achieved a sales price of €6060.

A computer with missing parts was in October 2011 sold for about US$20,100.

In April 2013 an eBay auction reached a price of 17,827 EUR.

In February 2015 an eBay auction closed at 20,050 EUR.

An eBay auction in November 2016 reached 15,605 EUR.

On September 7, 2017 a non-functional C65 missing a VIC-III chip, sold via eBay auction for US$18,350.

On October 8, 2017 a user at lemon64.com notified members their intent to sell a fully functioning C65 with the asking price of US$27,000.

In November 2017, a C65 prototype with RAM expansion board were sold for 81,450 €.

On December 30, 2017, a non-functioning C65 motherboard without most of the chips was sold on Ebay for US$790.

On May 18, 2019, a functional C65 was sold on eBay at 20,550 EUR.

On April 24, 2022, a working C65 was sold on eBay for 47,105 EUR.

Legacy
Because this computer was only a prototype, not many units were made. If one appears on eBay, it may sell for around $20,000.

MEGA65
On April 22, 2015 the Museum of Electronic Games & Art (MEGA) announced a recreation of this computer featuring similar specifications and technologies. Also backwards compatible with the Commodore 64, the MEGA65 features Commodore 65 compatible hardware recreated in FPGA and is compatible with newer technologies such as HDMI. MEGA initially aimed to release their recreation of the Commodore 65 computer for the third quarter of 2016, as of September 2020, the pre-release dev-kit (r3) has been sold out and the in total 100 Dev-kits were delivered in Q4 2020. As per 30 September 2021, the final version of the MEGA65 with recreated C65 case, was available for pre-order. The first batch of 400 computers has been released to the customers as of May 2022.

References

Further reading
 On the Edge: The Spectacular Rise and Fall of Commodore (2005), Variant Press. .

External links 

 Hi65: a high-level Commodore 65 emulator
 C65 page at 'The Secret Weapons of Commodore' website By Cameron Kaiser and The Commodore Knowledge Base
 FTP directory for the C65 at ftp.zimmers.net
 Andre Kaesmacher's C64DX Development Site
 C64DX System Specification document
 C65 System ROMs and Utility Software
 Commodore 65: Like The C64, But It's One Louder
 old-computers.com: LD-COMPUTERS.COM museum ~ Commodore C65, article on C65
 8-Bit-Nirvana: Commodore 65
 heimcomputer.de: Commodore C65 Prototyp, German C65-site with many photos and info
 toxic-waste.de: Commodore C65 Information Page by TXW
 cbmmuseum.kuto.de: CCOM - Commodore 65

Commodore 64
Commodore computers
Home computers
Prototypes